Tanycnema is a monotypic moth genus of the family Tineodidae or false plume moths. It was described by Alfred Jefferis Turner in 1922. Turner described the genus in Proceedings of the Royal Society of Victoria, writing:

The genus's one species, Tanycnema anomala, was described in the same article, as:

References

Tineodidae
Moths described in 1923
Monotypic moth genera